Morsel may refer to:

 Morsel (band), an indie rock ensemble
 Óláfr Guðrøðarson (died 1153), a twelfth-century King of the Isles
 Baking morsel, small, solid, soft piece of flavoring (often chocolate) used baking